The 1986–87 Wyoming Cowboys basketball team represented the University of Wyoming in the 1986–87 NCAA Division I men's basketball season. ("Cowboys" is solely used to refer to the university's men's sports; women's teams and athletes are known as "Cowgirls".) The Cowboys, then a member of the Western Athletic Conference, played their home games at the Arena-Auditorium.

The Cowboys were led by Fennis Dembo, who led the 1987 NCAA Tournament in scoring by averaging 27.8 points per game.

Roster

Regular season

Player stats

NCAA basketball tournament
West
Wyoming 64 (12),Virginia (5) 60
Wyoming 78, UCLA (4) 68
 UNLV (1) 92, Wyoming 78

Rankings

Team players drafted into the NBA
No one from the Cowboys was selected in the 1987 NBA Draft. Fennis Dembo would be drafted in the 1988 NBA Draft by the Detroit Pistons.

Awards and honors
Fennis Dembo, First Team All-Western Athletic Conference
Fennis Dembo, Western Athletic Conference Player of the Year

References

Wyoming Cowboys basketball seasons
Wyoming
Wyoming
1986 in sports in Wyoming
1987 in sports in Wyoming